Boyd H. Jarvis (October 26, 1958 – February 17, 2018) was an American record producer, remixer and musician, best known for his song, co-written with Jason Smith, "The Music Got Me"; released in 1983 by Prelude Records. He has collaborated with artists such as Herbie Hancock, La Toya Jackson and Johnny Kemp.

Career 
Boyd Jarvis started his career as an intern for renowned professor of Anthropology Pearl Primus, training under Sandra Ross in theater lighting and set design. He went on to design lighting for shows in Lincoln center, Perry Street theater, and Riverside church theater.

In 1981, Jervis started out playing music with his first synthesizer the Yamaha CS-15. He asked some local DJ's if he could take the synth to their club and jam over their music. They allowed him to do that and they loved it. One day DJ Timmy Regisford heard him, and asked to join him at some live DJ session to overdub and after that they started making music together at Regisford's house, with use of drum machines and reel to reel, which led to some remix jobs. Couple of his early instrumental tracks were called "One Love" and "Stomp" which ended up getting him a record deal for $5000.

His first official track, "Music Got Me" was released in 1983.

He also hosted a radio show, Saturday Night Dance Party, on New York's WBLS with Regisford. Together they also produced and remixed records for many well known artists of the time such as Madonna, Sade and Chaka Khan, among others.

Jarvis worked as a session musician for John "Jellybean" Benitez, Wally Jump, Jr. & the Criminal Element, Colonel Abrams, Herbie Hancock, and dance-pop acts like Club Nouveau and Pretty Poison. and as a producer and remixer he collaborated with Little Louie Vega and François Kevorkian.

Jarvis has a label called CFX Records.

Personal life 
Jarvis was diagnosed with cancer in 2016. Prior to his passing on February 17, 2018, he resided in New Jersey with his wife.

Jarvis v. A & M Records lawsuit 
In 1993, Jarvis sued Robert Clivillés and David Cole of C+C Music Factory for copyright infringement over their song "Get Dumb", which illegally (by sampling a sound recording without authorization) incorporates parts of "The Music Got Me".
Jarvis v. A & M Records was one of the first cases involving digital sampling.
"Get Dumb! (Free Your Body)" was recorded and released under names 'The Crew (featuring Freedom Williams)' and 'Seduction'. Multiple versions were released by Vendetta Records (sublabel of A&M Records).

"Get Dumb", written by Cole and Clivilles, incorporated elements of "The Music Got Me", most noticeably a distinctive keyboard riff and the bridge section composed of free your body sounds. Jarvis claimed that he has been damaged by $15 million, however he failed to demonstrate the amount of actual damages, which are measured by "[the] extent to which the market value of the copyrighted work at the time of infringement has been injured or destroyed by such infringement." Total damage was estimated at $95,872, using the data from "Get Dumb" profits.

Discography

Productions

Other selected credits

References

External links
Discogs entry

1958 births
2018 deaths
Record producers from New York (state)
Record producers from New Jersey
American male singers
American boogie musicians
American garage house musicians
American house musicians
American funk keyboardists
African-American rock musicians
Singers from New York (state)
Songwriters from New York (state)
Singers from New Jersey
Songwriters from New Jersey
Prelude Records artists
Remixers
African-American songwriters
20th-century African-American people
21st-century African-American people
American male songwriters